Leucanopsis taperana is a moth of the family Erebidae. It was described by William Schaus in 1933. It is found in Brazil and Paraguay.

References

taperana
Moths described in 1933